Șugag is a commune located in Alba County, Transylvania, Romania. It is composed of seven villages: Arți (Arctelep), Bârsana (Barzonatelep), Dobra (Dobratelep), Jidoștina (Jidostinatelep), Mărtinie (Martiniatelep), Șugag and Tău Bistra (Vartótelek).

The commune is traversed by the river Sebeș. It is located 43 km (27 miles) from Alba Iulia.

Natives

Zachary DeLorean, father of American automotive executive John DeLorean, was born and raised in Șugag.

References

Communes in Alba County
Localities in Transylvania